is a Japanese voice actress from Tokyo, Japan. After passing an audition in 2014, she made her debut as part of the idol group Earth Star Dream under EARTH STAR Entertainment. Following Earth Star Dream going on hiatus, she would continue her entertainment activities as a solo artist. She is known for her roles as Yū Hiraoka in Ani Tore! EX, Azalyn Goza the 168th in The Irresponsible Captain Tylor, Iris in Konosuba, Linnea in The Master of Ragnarok & Blesser of Einherjar, Latina in If It's for My Daughter, I'd Even Defeat a Demon Lord, and Noelle in Genshin Impact. She left EARTH STAR Entertainment and became affiliated with Link Plan all in the same year of 2018.

Biography
Takao was born in Tokyo on September 10, 2002. Her older brother Sōnosuke is a pianist and composer. She learned to play the piano at an early age, and she won an international piano contest held in Milan, Italy, when she was 10 years old.

In 2014, Takao participated in a voice acting audition held by the publishing company Earth Star Entertainment. She was declared one of the audition's two winners, along with Yuki Nakashima. Takao, Nakashima, and other participants in the audition then formed the idol group Earth Star Dream. During this period, she played the roles of Yū Hiraoka in Ani Tore! EX, Azalyn Goza the 168th in The Irresponsible Captain Tylor, and Linnea in The Master of Ragnarok & Blesser of Einherjar. She also formed the singing duo Hikanon together with labelmate Hikaru Koide; the duo performed the song "Smile Invitation" which was used as the theme song to The Irresponsible Galaxy Tylor.

After Earth Star Dream went on hiatus at the end of 2017, Takao initially remained with Earth Star Entertainment, but left the company in April 2018 after they ceased their talent management activities. She then joined the talent agency Link Plan in September of that year. In 2019, she was cast as Latina in the anime television series If It's for My Daughter, I'd Even Defeat a Demon Lord; she also performed the series' opening theme "I'm With You". In 2020, she was cast as Hina Tsurugi, the protagonist of the anime television series Diary of Our Days at the Breakwater.  In 2021, she was cast in several anime television series: Chisa Shiraishi in Idoly Pride, Yui Saikawa in The Detective Is Already Dead, and Rit in Banished from the Hero's Party, among others.

Filmography

Anime
2015
Teekyu as Natalia
Ani Tore! EX as Yū Hiraoka

2016
Usakame as Tasuku Kodaira

2017
The Irresponsible Captain Tylor as Azalyn Goza the 168th
Yuri's World as Yuri

2018
Encouragement of Climb Third Season as Yuri
The Master of Ragnarok & Blesser of Einherjar as Linnea

2019
Demon Lord, Retry! as Aku
If It's for My Daughter, I'd Even Defeat a Demon Lord as Latina

2020
Asteroid in Love as Haruka Itozaki
Magia Record as Mel Anna
Diary of Our Days at the Breakwater as Hina Tsurugi
Warlords of Sigrdrifa as Kurumi Suzuhara

2021
Idoly Pride as Chisa Shiraishi
Shinkansen Henkei Robo Shinkalion Z as Ayu Arata
Edens Zero as Hermit Mio
The Detective Is Already Dead as Yui Saikawa
Banished from the Hero's Party as Rit
Muv-Luv Alternative as Kasumi Yashiro

2022
In the Land of Leadale as Luka
Yu-Gi-Oh! Go Rush!! as Yuna Goha
Management of a Novice Alchemist as Sarasa Ford

Video games 
2018
Magia Record as Mel Anna and Kagome Satori
2020
Brave Nine as Seol Ah
 Genshin Impact as Noelle
 Kono Subarashii Sekai ni Shukufuku o! Fantastic Days as Iris
2022
 Artery Gear: Fusion as Blue
Cookie Run: Kingdom as Milky Way Cookie

References

External links
Official blog 
Official agency profile 

2002 births
Living people
Japanese child actresses
Japanese video game actresses
Japanese voice actresses
Voice actresses from Tokyo